Chroboly is a municipality and village in Prachatice District in the South Bohemian Region of the Czech Republic. It has about 600 inhabitants.

Administrative parts
Villages of Leptač, Lučenice, Ovesné, Příslop, Rohanov and Záhoří are administrative parts of Chroboly.

References

Villages in Prachatice District
Bohemian Forest